1857 Parchomenko, provisional designation , is a stony asteroid and suspected binary from the inner regions of the asteroid belt, approximately 8 kilometers in diameter.

It was discovered on 30 August 1971, by Russian astronomer Tamara Smirnova at Crimean Astrophysical Observatory in Nauchnyj, on the Crimean peninsula, and named after astronomer Praskoviya Parchomenko.

Orbit and classification 

Parchomenko orbits the Sun in the inner main-belt at a distance of 1.9–2.5 AU once every 3 years and 4 months (1,228 days). Its orbit has an eccentricity of 0.13 and an inclination of 4° with respect to the ecliptic.

Physical characteristics 

In the SMASS classification, Parchomenko is a common S-type asteroid.

Diameter and albedo 

According to the survey carried out by NASA's Wide-field Infrared Survey Explorer with its subsequent NEOWISE mission, Parchomenko measures 7.99 and 9.84 kilometers in diameter, and its surface has an albedo of 0.295 and 0.333, respectively. The Collaborative Asteroid Lightcurve Link assumes a standard albedo for stony asteroids of 0.20 and calculates a diameter of 8.5 kilometers, based on an absolute magnitude of 12.4.

Rotation period 

In December 2005, a rotational lightcurve of Parchomenko was obtained from a photometric observations by Robert Stephens, Brian Warner and Petr Pravec. It gave a well-defined rotation period of 3.1177 hours with a brightness variation of 0.22 magnitude.

Suspected binary 

Three possible occultation events were observed, suggesting that Parchomenko might be a binary asteroid, having a minor-planet moon as companion. However, no new findings have been made since. In October 2008, Italian amateur astronomer Silvano Casulli measured a similar period of 3.08 hours with an amplitude of 0.27 magnitude.

Naming 

This minor planet was named in honor of Russian astronomer Praskoviya Parchomenko (1886–1970), who observed and discovered the minor planets 1129 Neujmina and 1166 Sakuntala at the Crimean Simeiz Observatory during the 1930s and 1940s. The official  was published by the Minor Planet Center on 1 June 1975.

References

External links 
 Lightcurve plot of 1857 Parchomenko, Palmer Divide Observatory, B. D. Warner (2006)
 Asteroid Lightcurve Database (LCDB), query form (info )
 Dictionary of Minor Planet Names, Google books
 Asteroids and comets rotation curves, CdR – Observatoire de Genève, Raoul Behrend
 Discovery Circumstances: Numbered Minor Planets (1)-(5000) – Minor Planet Center
 
 

001857
Discoveries by Tamara Mikhaylovna Smirnova
Named minor planets
001857
19710830